The China Tibet Mountaineering Association (also known as China Tibet Mountaineering Team) is the only authorized issuing authority of Everest summiteers on the northern Tibetan side of the mountain.

References

External links 
 Official web site

Sports governing bodies in China
Climbing organizations
Tibet